Pablo Sierra Madrazo (born 3 October 1978) is a Spanish retired footballer who played as a right winger.

Football career
Born in Santander, Cantabria, Sierra played with amateur clubs in his native regions until 1998 when he signed with Racing de Santander, first being assigned to the B-team in the lower leagues. He made his debuts with the main squad during the 2001–02 season, scoring three goals in 38 games in an eventual promotion to La Liga after one year out.

Sierra played his first match in the Spanish top flight on 31 August 2002, coming on as a late substitute in a 0–1 home loss against Real Valladolid. He subsequently began a series of loans in Segunda División, being definitely released in the 2005 summer and joining Real Murcia also in that level.

Honours
Racing Santander B
Tercera División: 1998–99

References

External links

1978 births
Living people
Spanish footballers
Footballers from Santander, Spain
Association football wingers
La Liga players
Segunda División players
Segunda División B players
Tercera División players
Rayo Cantabria players
Racing de Santander players
Albacete Balompié players
Córdoba CF players
Real Murcia players
UE Lleida players
UE Sant Andreu footballers
Burgos CF footballers
Aris Thessaloniki F.C. players
Spanish expatriate footballers
Expatriate footballers in Greece